"How Many Ways" is a song by American singer Toni Braxton. It was written by Braxton, Vincent Herbert, Philip Field, Ben Garrison, Keith Miller, and Noel Goring for her self-titled debut album (1993), while production was helmed by Herbert. The song is built around a sample of "God Make Me Funky" (1975) by  American jazz-fusion band The Headhunters featuring Pointer Sisters. Due to the inclusion of the sample, several other writers are credited as songwriters. Lyrically, the protagonist of the composition declares there are many ways in which she loves her man.

The song was released as the album's fifth and final single on June 10, 1994 by LaFace and Arista Records, a double-A-side along with "I Belong to You". It peaked at number 28 on the Billboard Hot 100 on January 21, 1995. A remix version of "How Many Ways", produced by R. Kelly, also was released to radio and music television stations. An accompanying music video features Braxton and actor Shemar Moore riding in a car, frolicking in a playground, and on a veranda.

Critical reception
Larry Flick from Billboard wrote that the song "benefits from a refreshing R. Kelly remix that plugs into current top 40 and R&B radio trends. On its own merit, the song is a romantic ballad with an instantly memorable chorus. Braxton provides added dimension with a sultry, well-shaded vocal that is a reminder of why she is among the leading urban divas of the moment. What else can be said?"

Track listings

Credits and personnel
Credits lifted from Toni Braxtons liner notes.

 Anthony Beard – writing
 Toni Braxton – vocals, writing
 Philip Field – writing
 Ben Garrison – mixing, recording, writing

 Chris Gehringer – mastering
 Noel Goring – music, writing
 Vince Herbert – mixing, music, production
 Keith Miller – writing

Charts

Weekly charts

Year-end charts

Notes

References

1993 songs
1994 singles
LaFace Records singles
Arista Records singles
Songs written by Toni Braxton
Toni Braxton songs
Songs written by Vincent Herbert
Song recordings produced by R. Kelly